is a Japanese actress. She played the role of villain in the horror film Carved as the Kuchisake-Onna a malevolent vengeful spirit who killed many children.

Career
Mizuno starred in Takanori Tsujimoto's action films Hard Revenge Milly and Hard Revenge Milly: Bloody Battle. She also starred in Sion Sono's 2011 film Guilty of Romance.

Filmography

Film
 Kunoichi Ninpocho (1991)
 Honban Joyu (1992)
 Kunoichi Ninpocho 2: Sei Shojo no Hiho (1992)
 Sadistic Mariya (1992)
 Shura no Jakushi: Narumi 2 (1993)
 Nekketsu Golf Club (1994)
 Raiden (1994)
 Shoot (1994)
 Daishitsuren (1995)
 Gamera 2: Attack of Legion (1996)
 Bayside Shakedown: The Movie (1998), Yukino Kashiwagi
 Genjitsu no Tsuzuki Yume no Owari (1999)
 Senrigan (2000)
 Bayside Shakedown 2 (2003), Yukino Kashiwagi
 My Lover Is a Sniper (2004)
 Negotiator (2005)
 Zukan ni Nottenai Mushi (2007)
 Carved (2007)
 Wenny Has Wings (2008)
 Sasori: Prisoner 701 (2008)
 Hard Revenge Milly (2008)
 Hard Revenge Milly: Bloody Battle (2009)
 Castle Under Fiery Skies (2009)
 Waya! Uchuu Ichi no Osekkai Daisakusen (2011)
 Guilty of Romance (2011)
 Dead Mine (2012)
 I'll Give It My All... Tomorrow (2013)
 Sweet Bean (2015)
 The Brightest Roof in the Universe (2020)
 To Every You I've Loved Before (2022), Shiori's mother (voice)
 To Me, The One Who Loved You (2022), Shiori's mother (voice)

Television
 Itoko Doshi (1992)
 Yume Miru Koro o Sugitemo (1994)
 Koibito yo (1995)
 Natural Ai no Yukue (1996)
 Tsubasa o Kudasai! (1996)
 Age 35 Koishikute (1996)
 Best Partner (1997)
 Shokuinshitsu (1997)
 Bayside Shakedown (1997)
 Hotel (1998)
 Team (1999)
 Kanojotachi no Jidai (1999)
 Salaryman Kintaro (1999)
 Oyaji (2000)
 Hanamura Daisuke (2000)
 Beautiful Life (2000)
 Koi ga Shitai x3 (2001)
 Joshiana (2001)
 Shiawase no Shippo (2002)
 Hatsutaiken (2002)
 Koibumi (2003)
 Okaasan to Issho (2003)
 Tobosha (2004)
 Dream (2004)
 Slow Start (2007)
 Galileo (2007)
 Hakui no Namida (2013)
 The Flying PR Room (2013)
 Jiken Kyūmeii: Imat no Kiseki (2013)
 Umi no Ue no Shinryōjo Episode 10 (2013)
 Team Bachisuta 4 (2014)
 Jiken Kyūmeii2: Imat no Kiseki (2014)
 Kazoku Gari (2014)
 Masshiro (2015)
 I'm Home (2015)
 37.5°C no Namida (2015)
 Love Song (2016)
 Scarlet (2019–20)
 The Way of the Househusband (2020)
 Colorful Love: Genderless Danshi ni Aisareteimasu (2021)

References

External links
 
 
 

1974 births
Actors from Mie Prefecture
Japanese film actresses
Japanese television actresses
Living people
People from Yokkaichi
20th-century Japanese actresses
21st-century Japanese actresses